Sinningia bullata is a tuberous member of the flowering plant family Gesneriaceae. It produces small orange-red flowers and is found in Brazil. It is named for its bullate leaves, and also produces a woolly backing to its leaves.

References

Further reading
Pereira-Dias, Francis, and Marisa Santos. "Adaptive strategies against water stress: a study comparing leaf morphoanatomy of rupicolous and epiphytic species of Gesneriaceae." Brazilian Journal of Botany 38.4 (2015): 911–919.
Ferreira, Gabriel Emiliano, Alain Chautems, and Jorge Luiz Waechter. "A new unexpected record of Sinningia bullata Chautems & M. Peixoto (Gesneriaceae) in Southern Brazil." Rodriguésia 65.4 (2014): 1037–1042.

External links

bullata
Flora of Brazil